Abrumand (also Romanized as Ābrūmand; also known as Ārūmand) is a village in Abrumand Rural District, in the Central District of Bahar County, Hamadan Province, Iran. At the 2006 census, its population was 1,637, in 419 families.

References 

Populated places in Bahar County